The Meriden Bridge is a historic covered bridge in the Meriden area of Plainfield, New Hampshire.  The bridge is a single span which carries Colby Hill Road over Bloods Brook, just west of a junction with Main Street and Willow Brook Road.  Built about 1880, it is one of New Hampshire's few surviving 19th-century covered bridges.  It was listed on the National Register of Historic Places in 1980.

Description and history
The Meriden Bridge is located north of the village of Meriden on Colby Hill Road just west of Main Street. The lower third of the sides is shielded by vertical board siding (to a height of about ), as are the top section of the portals.

The bridge was built about 1880 by James Tasker of nearby Cornish, a well-known regional builder of covered bridges. It underwent rehabilitation several times in the 20th century, including a complete rebuilding in 1963, when concrete abutments were laid, and steel beams were added to carry the active load.

See also

List of New Hampshire covered bridges
List of bridges on the National Register of Historic Places in New Hampshire
National Register of Historic Places listings in Sullivan County, New Hampshire

References

External links

Covered bridges on the National Register of Historic Places in New Hampshire
Bridges completed in 1880
Bridges in Sullivan County, New Hampshire
National Register of Historic Places in Sullivan County, New Hampshire
Road bridges on the National Register of Historic Places in New Hampshire
Wooden bridges in New Hampshire
King post truss bridges in the United States
Plainfield, New Hampshire